This list is of the Places of Scenic Beauty of Japan located within the Prefecture of Miyagi.

National Places of Scenic Beauty
As of 1 January 2021, seven Places have been designated at a national level (including one *Special Place of Scenic Beauty); Landscape of Oku no Hosomichi is a serial designation spanning ten prefectures.

Prefectural Places of Scenic Beauty
As of 1 May 2020, two Places have been designated at a prefectural level.

Municipal Places of Scenic Beauty
As of 1 May 2020, twelve Places have been designated at a municipal level.

See also
 Cultural Properties of Japan
 List of Historic Sites of Japan (Miyagi)
 List of parks and gardens of Miyagi Prefecture

References

External links
  Cultural Properties of Miyagi Prefecture

Tourist attractions in Miyagi Prefecture
Places of Scenic Beauty